Sarana, Sabou is a town in the Sabou Department of Boulkiemdé Province in central western Burkina Faso. It has a population of 1,103.

References

Populated places in Boulkiemdé Province